5 is a comics anthology by Gabriel Bá, Becky Cloonan, Fábio Moon, Rafael Grampá and Vasilis Lolos.

The title won the 2008 Eisner Award for Best Anthology.

Notes

References

External links
 

2007 comics debuts
2007 graphic novels
Comics anthologies
Eisner Award winners for Best Anthology